Aero AT Sp.z o.o. is a Polish light aircraft manufacturer founded by Tomasz Antoniewski in Warsaw in 1994. It is unrelated to the Czech Aero company.

The company is organized as a Spółka z ograniczoną odpowiedzialnością (Sp.z o.o.), a Polish private limited company.

The company was founded to develop and market a two-seat aircraft specifically for the flight training and touring market. The result of this venture was the Aero AT-3, type certified by European Aviation Safety Agency in May 1999 under the EASA CS-VLA rules, only the sixth aircraft type to receive this certification. The first five production aircraft were delivered to customers in 2002. A version for the light-sport aircraft market was accepted by the Federal Aviation Administration and marketed as the Gobosh 700 in the United States.

Aircraft

Aero AT-1
Aero P220S AT-2
Aero AT-3 (1997) – Single-engine two-seat low-wing Very Light Aircraft (VLA) with fixed tricycle undercarriage. Marketed in Europe in two versions - the SK (Standard Kit) and the R100. The Gobosh 700S is a version marketed in the U.S.
Aero AT-3S (S for Sport) was launched at the Aero Friedrichshafen 2017. Weighing just 600 kg, it is a refined variant of the AT-4.
Aero AT-4

References

External links

Company website

Aircraft manufacturers of Poland
Science and technology in Poland
Aircraft propeller manufacturers
Manufacturing companies based in Warsaw
1994 establishments in Poland
Polish brands